In mathematics, more particularly in complex geometry,
algebraic geometry and complex analysis, a positive current
is a positive (n-p,n-p)-form over an n-dimensional complex manifold,
taking values in distributions.

For a formal definition, consider a manifold M.
Currents on M are (by definition)
differential forms with coefficients in distributions. ; integrating
over M, we may consider currents as "currents of integration",
that is, functionals

on smooth forms with compact support. This way, currents
are considered as elements in the dual space to the space
 of forms with compact support.

Now, let M be a complex manifold.
The Hodge decomposition 
is defined on currents, in a natural way, the (p,q)-currents being

A positive current is defined as a real current
of Hodge type (p,p), taking non-negative values on all positive
(p,p)-forms.

Characterization of Kähler manifolds 

Using the Hahn–Banach theorem, Harvey and Lawson proved the following criterion of existence of  Kähler metrics.

Theorem: Let M be a compact complex manifold. Then M does not admit a Kähler structure if and only if M admits a non-zero positive (1,1)-current  which is a (1,1)-part of an exact 2-current.

Note that the de Rham differential maps 3-currents to 2-currents, hence  is a differential of a 3-current; if  is a current of integration of a complex curve, this means that this curve is a (1,1)-part of a boundary.

When M admits a surjective map  to a Kähler manifold with 1-dimensional fibers, this theorem leads to the following result of complex algebraic geometry.

Notes

References 
P. Griffiths and J. Harris (1978), Principles of Algebraic Geometry, Wiley. 
J.-P. Demailly, $L^2$ vanishing theorems for positive line bundles and adjunction theory, Lecture Notes of a CIME course on "Transcendental Methods of Algebraic Geometry" (Cetraro, Italy, July 1994)

Complex manifolds
Several complex variables